Steven Griffith (March 12, 1961 – November 1, 2022) was an American ice hockey player. He played for the University of Minnesota Golden Gophers during his career. He also played for the American national team at the 1984 Winter Olympics and 1981 World Junior Championship.

Career statistics

Regular season and playoffs

International

References

External links
 

1961 births
2022 deaths
Ice hockey players at the 1984 Winter Olympics
Minnesota Golden Gophers men's ice hockey players
Olympic ice hockey players of the United States
People from Roseville, Minnesota
American men's ice hockey left wingers